Q77 may refer to:
 Q77 (New York City bus)
 Al-Mursalat, a surah of the Quran